Sechszinkenspitze is a mountain of Bavaria, Germany.

References

Mountains of Bavaria
Mountains of the Alps